Stephen Glover (born 13 January 1952) is a British journalist and columnist for the Daily Mail.

Early life
Glover was educated at Shrewsbury School and Mansfield College, Oxford.

Career
Glover co-founded The Independent in 1986 with Andreas Whittam Smith and Matthew Symonds. All three had previously been journalists on The Daily Telegraph and had left the paper towards the end of Lord Hartwell's ownership. Between 1986 and 1990 Glover was Foreign Editor of The Independent. In 1990 he became the founding editor of The Independent on Sunday. In 1992 Glover helped Richard Ingrams launch The Oldie magazine with fellow journalists Auberon Waugh, Alexander Chancellor, and Patrick Marnham.

Glover has been a columnist for the  London Evening Standard (1992–95), The Daily Telegraph (1995–97), The Spectator (1996–2005) and The Independent (2005–12). He has written a column for the Daily Mail since 1998. In April 2012, The Guardian reported that Glover's contract with The Independent had been terminated.

In 2004, Glover proposed a new compact upmarket newspaper to be called The World with fellow journalists Francis Wheen and Frank Johnson under the chairmanship of Adam Broadbent, a former managing director of finances at Schroders plc. The proposed newspaper was loosely modelled on Le Monde in France, and was intended as a response to the dumbing down of some quality titles. It was reported that Glover and his colleagues sought only £15.4 million to launch The World, less than the budget for The Independent almost 20 years earlier, though this amount was subsequently slightly increased. The project did not get off the ground.

Glover is the author of Paper Dreams (1993), an account of the founding of The Independent, and editor of The Penguin Book of Journalism (1999). His first novel, Splash, was published by Constable in 2017.

References

1952 births
People educated at Shrewsbury School
Living people
British male journalists
The Independent founders
Daily Mail journalists
Alumni of Mansfield College, Oxford
The Independent on Sunday editors